My Father's Bike is a 2012 Polish comedy film directed by Piotr Trzaskalski. The film premiered at the Gdynia Film Festival, where Trzaskalski and Wojciech Lepianka won best screenplay.

Cast
Michał Urbaniak as Wlodzimierz Starnawski
Artur Żmijewski as Pawel Starnawski
Krzysztof Chodorowski as Maciek Starnawski
Witold Dębicki as Franek Wera
Anna Nehrebecka as Barbara Starnawska
Piotr Szczepanik as Mirek

Reception and awards
Neil Young of The Hollywood Reporter wrote that a "music-themed Polish comedy-drama of inter-generational family matters may strike a chord with domestic audiences".

The film was awarded the Golden Teeth Award at the 2005 Polish Film Festival in America.

References

External links

2012 comedy films
Polish comedy films